Radio France is the French national public radio broadcaster.

Stations
Radio France offers seven national networks:
France Inter — Radio France's "generalist" station, featuring entertaining and informative talk mixed with a wide variety of music, plus hourly news bulletins with extended news coverage in the morning, midday, and early-evening peaks
France Info — 24-hour news
France Culture — cultural programming covering the arts, history, science, philosophy, etc. together with in-depth news coverage at peak times
France Musique — classical music and jazz
France Bleu — a network of 44 regional stations, mixing popular music with locally based talk and information, including:
France Bleu 107.1 — for the Paris-Île-de-France region
France Bleu Béarn — Pyrénées-Atlantiques
France Bleu Nord — Nord and Pas de Calais
FIP — specialising in a wide range of music – classical, hip hop, jazz, chanson, rock, blues, world music – and minimal speech
Mouv'  — pop music, aimed at a young audience

Mission
Radio France's two principal missions are:
 To create and expand the programming on all of their stations; and
 To assure the development and the management of the following four orchestras and choirs:
 l'Orchestre National de France (National Orchestra of France)
 l'Orchestre Philharmonique de Radio France (Radio France Philharmonic Orchestra)
 Le Chœur de Radio France (Choir of Radio France)
 La Maîtrise de Radio France (Choir School of Radio France with a choir of children and teenagers)

History

 1897: A year after Marconi's experiments, Eugène Ducretet begins his trials of radio broadcasting from a mast on the third level of the Eiffel Tower
 1921: The weather forecast and the stock market prices are read from a studio in the Eiffel Tower.
 6 November 1922 (eight days before the BBC): Radiola, the first French private radio transmitter, begins regular broadcasts. It changes its name to Radio Paris in 1924. It is followed by Radio Toulouse and Radio Lyon, and in 1932/1933 by Radio Luxembourg. Before World War II, 14 commercial and 12 public sector radios operate in France.
 1940–44: In both the German Occupied zone and under the Vichy regime in the south, radio is taken over by the State.
 1942–43: With the agreement of Vichy, Radio Monte Carlo and its financial holding company la SOFIRAD are born.
 1944: At the Liberation of France, the state broadcasting monopoly is retained for practical and ideological reasons. Public service radio broadcasting is ensured by the RDF, soon to be called the RTF, then the ORTF in 1964.
 1955: The commercial station Europe No. 1 begins broadcasting from across the border in the Saarland region of Germany, freed from French occupation in that year.
 1965: Under the management of Roland Dhordain, the four French radio stations are reorganised: France I and II are merged to "RTF Inter", later renamed "France Inter"; France III is renamed "RTF Promotion", and later "France Culture"; France IV is renamed "RTF Haute Fidelité", and later "France Musique".
 1975: When the ORTF is broken up into separate TV channels (TF1 (Télévision française 1), antenne 2, France Région 3), technical services (TDF — Télédiffusion de France), archive services and professional training (INA — Institut National de l'Audiovisuel), production and audiovisual creation services (SFP — Société Française de Production) and radio, Radio France gains its independence from other media institutions as the state controlled public service radio broadcaster.
 1981: Following pressure from the independent and commercial radio lobbies and pirate broadcasters, the newly elected President François Mitterrand allows the licensing of "free" radio stations, to become "radios locales privées", initially with a state subsidy and then financed by commercial advertising (1984), and finally to group themselves into national networks (1986). A private radio sector broadcasting from within French borders is reborn.
 1999: The daily radio audience (reach) is 83%. They listen on average for over three hours a day. 99% of French homes have a radio. 80% of French households have a car radio, and 26.8% a personal stereo.
 2000: Radio France re-organises its radio network. France Bleu becomes a regional-only network, primarily on FM (the national AM radio network was re-attributed to France Info) and several FIP stations in large cities were closed down and replaced with youth station Le Mouv'.
 2015: Radio France announced the end of its Medium Wave (AM) broadcasts at the end of 31 December.

Headquarters

Radio France has its headquarters at the Maison de la Radio, a circular building designed by the architect Henry Bernard (architect)
and inaugurated in December 1963 by President Charles de Gaulle, which stands beside the River Seine in the 16th arrondissement of Paris. In addition to housing Radio France's central services and the studios of several of its channels, the building is home to the Musée de Radio France, a museum of radio and television broadcasting and recording techniques. The building caught fire in October 2014.

Equipment 
The head office has around a hundred studios (for radio broadcasts, fictions, concerts etc.) and an auditorium:
 Auditorium of Radio France: built on the site of the former studios 102 and 103;
 Studio 104 (856 sits) ;
 Studio 105 (237 sits) and studio 106 (137 sits) dedicated to public broadcasts and concerts of musical broadcasts;
 Studios 611 and 621 dedicated to the France Inter channel (just like studios 511 and 521);
 Studio 221 is the "telegenic" studio, where programs such as "Les Informés", "8.30 Franceinfo", or "Questions Politiques" are broadcast on the television channel France Info.

Budget 
The Radio France group is 100% owned by the French State. Nearly 80% of Radio France's funding comes from Television licence, the remaining 20% comes from own resources, mainly from advertising and diversification activities developed by Radio France.

Organization

General 
In September 2019, a bill emanating from the Ministry of Culture announces the creation of “France Médias”, a parent company which will bring together France Télévisions, Radio France, France Médias Monde and the INA. This bill also provides for the end of the appointments of directors of Radio France by the CSA, a power which will be attributed to the board of directors of the radiophonic entity, which will continue to operate independently, but also in synergy with the other entities of France Médias.

Presidents and CEOs 
Mathieu Gallet, former President and CEO of the Institut national de l'audiovisuel|National Audiovisual Institute (INA) from 2010 to 2014, was unanimously appointed by the members of the Higher Audiovisual Counci] (CSA)

Communication 
Beyond its primary profession which is to make radio, Radio France works on many political, social or cultural projects. The group deploys resources to support various causes, is committed on several fronts, and makes it known through communication actions. Thus, in 2018 Radio France indicates that:
 The new 2018-2020 company agreement "supports Radio France's proactive policy in favor of equal opportunities";
 A new three-year company agreement to promote professional and salary equality between men and women was signed on 1 July 2018.
 Since 2016, "project partnerships" have been carried out for the cultural development of French-speaking countries (Benin, Haiti, Gabon).
 The audiovisual group and the France-China Committee join forces to promote economic and cultural exchanges between France and China around music
 He signs the creation of an artistic exchange program based on a circle of patrons in China
 It supports the European Week for the Employment of People with Disabilities, by providing activities at the Maison de la Radio

Ethics committee 
In application of the law of 14 November 2016 and its implementing decree of 21 March 2017, an ethics committee is created to strengthen freedom, the independence and pluralism of the media. […] This committee is made up of five independent individuals appointed for three years, and whose mandate is renewable.

Group activities

Information and investigation 
The investigation unit of Radio France, the usual name of the investigation and investigation department of Radio France, is divided into three poles: production, digital, and investigation. This last pole includes five investigators.

The investigation unit has been a partner of Disclose since 2018.

Regular and event-based partnerships 
When the news so requires, Radio France stations resort to event programming, which is no longer subject to the program schedules. These events, whether political, economic, societal, cultural or sporting, can be found in the pages retracing the annual chronologies of the radio media.

Diffusion 
Hertzian broadcasting

Since 1975, Radio France has been broadcasting in FM on almost the entire territory.

Radio France broadcast between 1975 and 2016 in AM: France Inter GO (1939-2016); France Inter PO (1956-1996); France Inter OC (1975-1981), France Culture PO (1975-1980); Radio Bleu PO (1980-2000); France Info PO (2000-2016).

In 2016, Radio France's programs were broadcast in RNT ( DAB +) over the Paris region via an experiment. In 2019, the CSA allocates to all the national frequencies of Radio France, via a call for tenders procedure, broadcast in DAB +. This technology mainly aims to allow better sound quality, the addition of data synchronized or not with the radio (scrolling texts, images, information, websites, etc.) and a lower broadcasting cost than that of FM.

Digital broadcasting 
Since 2006, Radio France has produced its programs entirely in digital and since 2012 has offered numerous programs in podcast in MP3 format. From 2014, faced with the boom in the consumption of videos on the Internet, and the development of the use of tablets or smartphones, Radio France introduced the concept of "enriched radio" which consists of filming the studio during the recording some radio broadcasts. The video is then put online live (in  streaming ) on the station's website or inserted into a video catalog so that it can be viewed after the broadcast on air.

See also
 Radio France Internationale
 Public Francophone Radios

References

 Information from Geoff Hare, Newcastle University

External links

  
 Radio France Streaming Online 

 
Publicly funded broadcasters
Radio in France
16th arrondissement of Paris
European Broadcasting Union members
Radio stations established in 1922